The Roman Catholic Diocese of Wabag is  a suffragan diocese of the Roman Catholic Archdiocese of Mount Hagen. It was erected in 1982.

Bishops

Ordinaries
 Hermann Raich, S.V.D. (1982–2008)
 Arnold Orowae (since 2008)

Coadjutor bishop
Arnold Orowae (2004-2008)

Auxiliary bishop
Arnold Orowae (1999-2004), appointed Coadjutor here

See also
Catholic Church in Papua New Guinea
List of Catholic dioceses in Papua New Guinea & Solomon Islands

References

External links

Wabag
Roman Catholic dioceses and prelatures established in the 20th century